The Ukrainian Women's Volleyball Super League is the highest professional women's volleyball league in Ukraine. It is organized and administrated by the Ukrainian Volleyball Federation (FVU).

History
The dissolution of the Soviet Union in late 1991 brought an end to all sports leagues played in the Soviet Union, including the Soviet Women's Volleyball Championship, which existed since 1933. There is a relegation and promotion system between the two leagues.

The best teams of the Super League are allocated places to compete in European club competition tournaments organized by the Confédération Européenne de Volleyball (CEV).

Ukrainian women's volleyball champions

Performance by club

See also
 Ukrainian Men's Volleyball Super League

References

External links
 Official website of the FVU 
 Volleyball in Ukraine 
  Ukrainian Superliga. women.volleybox.net 

Volleyball competitions in Ukraine
Ukraine
Volleyball
Women's volleyball leagues
Sports leagues established in 1992
1992 establishments in Ukraine
Volleyball
Professional sports leagues in Ukraine